Hernán Botbol (born 18 October 1981) is an Argentine tech entrepreneur who created several successful businesses. Currently he's running Apply Ai Corporation from Austin Texas.

Bio

Botbol is a technology and internet enthusiast. He attended high school at Hapnot Collegiate High School in Manitoba, Canada and later pursued a degree in Economics and Business Administration at Universidad Argentina de la Empresa in Buenos Aires, Argentina. His entrepreneurial endeavors date back to 2005 when he co-founded his first Company, Wiroos Internet Hosting, alongside his brother, Matías Botbol, and associate, Alberto Nakayama. This company provides web hosting services. Botbol received international recognition when Taringa.net was acquired in 2006, and then relaunched in 2007. It became one of the most successful Spanish-speaking web pages before the emergence of social networks like Facebook and Twitter.

Taringa! established itself as one of the most-visited Spanish-language websites with its user base of nearly 100 million unique users per month and its presence in 18 countries in Latin America, Spain, and the United States. Behind Facebook, Taringa! is the second most popular domestic social media platform in Latin America, and the second largest social network in Argentina (according to data from comScore).

Currently Botbol is Co-Founder and CEO at Apply ai.

Awards and recognition
In 2010, he shared the award Premio Oscarlos Argentina, or Argentine Creative Award, with Matias Botbol (his elder brother) and Alberto Nakayama. This award from the Círculo de Creativos Argentinos (the Circle of Creative Argentinians) distinguishes the creative work of professionals in various fields. The three young entrepreneurs received it not only because Taringa! became one of the most visited Latin American sites in the world, but also because it evolved into a community of unique users with its their rules, protocols, and unique identity.
In 2012, Taringa! received the “Website of the Year” award, which recognized it as the best social network of the year. The European online research company Metrix Lab has been organizing this award for 10 years Taringa! was the only Latin American business nominated. Even though it faced competition from websites like Facebook, Twitter, and Instagram in the Communities and Social Networks category, Taringa! was chosen by the users to be the winner.

Moreover, Hernán Botbol was distinguished as one of the entrepreneurs of the year by the Universidad de Palermo in Argentina. This award is presented to the most important figures in Argentina’s entrepreneurial field.

Speaker and industry leader
Botbol is a leader of the Spanish-speaking  Internet and Digital Media industry. He has participated as a speaker at many major industry conferences including Red Innova (Madrid, June de 2012), Show me the money (2012), Premio estilo emprendedor Palermo 2012, Pechakucha (June 2013), Orador Cirerre del Social Media Day Montevideo (June 2013), Speaker en IAB Argentina (August 2013), Speaker IAB Uruguay, Foro Digital organized by the Ministerio de Cultura de La Nación (September 2013), CACE (Cámara Argentina de Comercio Elecrónico), session Conversando con Mirtha Legrand(September 2013).

References

1981 births
Living people
Argentine chief executives
Businesspeople from Buenos Aires
Argentine LGBT businesspeople
People from Mountain View, California